David Michael Koechner (born August 24, 1962) is an American actor and comedian. He is best known for playing roles such as Champ Kind in the Anchorman films and Todd Packer on NBC's The Office.

Koechner first became involved in performing when he began studying improvisational comedy in Chicago at ImprovOlympic, under the teachings of Del Close, before joining the Second City Northwest. Koechner relocated to New York City in 1995, doing year long stints of sketch comedy as a cast member on Saturday Night Live (1995–1996) and as a sketch regular on Late Night with Conan O'Brien in the mid-1990s. In 1997, Koechner moved to Los Angeles and started working regularly in various film and television comedies, making his first film appearances with small roles in the films such as Wag the Dog, Austin Powers: The Spy Who Shagged Me, and Man on the Moon.

While filming the country mockumentary film Dill Scallion in 1998, Koechner befriended actor/comedian Dave 'Gruber' Allen, and eventually began performing as the comedy duo, The Naked Trucker & T-Bones Show, a live musical comedy act. The act became a hit at Hollywood clubs such as Largo, and Allen and Koechner were invited to open for Tenacious D. In 2007, Koechner and Allen created and starred together in a Naked Trucker & T-Bones Show sketch comedy series that ran for one season on Comedy Central.

After his breakout role as Champ Kind in the 2004 comedy Anchorman, Koechner began appearing frequently with larger supporting roles in many high-profile comedic films including Talladega Nights, Thank You for Smoking, Waiting..., Semi-Pro, The Goods: Live Hard, Sell Hard, and Extract. His first leading film role, as Coach Lambeau Fields in Fox Atomic's sports comedy, The Comebacks opened on October 19, 2007. More recently, Koechner reprised his role of Champ Kind for Anchorman 2: The Legend Continues, co-starred in the horror-comedy Krampus, and received praise from critics for his dark turn in the 2014 black comedy Cheap Thrills. He co-starred in the sitcoms Bless This Mess and Superior Donuts and recurred on Comedy Central's Another Period and on Showtime's reboot of Twin Peaks. He makes regular appearances on the ABC sitcom The Goldbergs and provides the voices of Dick Reynolds on American Dad!.

Early life
Koechner was born on August 24, 1962, in Tipton, Missouri, to Margaret Ann (née Downey) and Cecil Stephen Koechner. He has two brothers, Mark and Joe, and three sisters, Mary-Rose, Cecilia and Joan. His father ran a business that manufactured turkey coops (Koechner has stated that "If you see a turkey going down the road in a big truck, most likely its coop is from Tipton..."). He was raised Catholic, and is of German, English, and Irish descent. Koechner studied Political Science at Benedictine College and the University of Missouri, before he eventually decided to pursue a career in improvisational comedy and moved to Chicago. After studying at Chicago's ImprovOlympic, under famed improvisation instructor Del Close, Koechner joined The Second City comedy troupe in Chicago, graduating in 1994.

Career

Early career
In 1995, Koechner landed a year-long stint on Saturday Night Live, joining the show with Second City friends Nancy Walls and Adam McKay. During his time at SNL, he befriended guest-writer David 'Gruber' Allen, and castmate Will Ferrell. Some of Koechner's recurring skits included Bill Brasky, the British Fops (playing Fagan, opposite Mark McKinney), Gary Macdonald (the fictional younger brother of Weekend Update anchor/SNL castmember Norm Macdonald, based on "Jokey", a character he originated at Second City), Will Ferrell's "Get Off the Shed" sketches (playing his neighbor, Tom Taylor), and Gerald "T-Bones" Tibbons. Koechner impersonated several celebrities, including Christian Elliott, Mike Ditka, Charlie Sheen, Robert Shapiro, Willard Scott, Oliver Stone, Phil Gramm, David Kaczynski, and Pat Buchanan. After his one season on SNL, Koechner joined the 1996–97 sketch cast of Late Night with Conan O'Brien.

Partnership with David "Gruber" Allen
On the set of the 1999 country music mockumentary, Dill Scallion, Koechner struck a partnership with SNL colleague David "Gruber" Allen, joining Allen's improvisational comedy act, The Naked Trucker Show.

Koechner joined the act as Gerald "T-Bones" Tibbons, a character he had been playing on comedy stages for a few years, including a recurring character bit on SNL. Gerald Tibbons dates back to 1995, when he filmed a short television pilot based on the character's misadventures. The "Gerald" character, based on a real drifter named Four-Way George, became so popular that Koechner would go to auditions, only to find that directors were always demanding his stage persona. The stage act, a mix of stand-up comedy and off-color country songs, became a hit on the Hollywood improv circuit, ultimately landing television performances on Late Night with Conan O'Brien, Jimmy Kimmel Live! and Real Time with Bill Maher. The Naked Trucker and T-Bones Show toured with fellow comedic musical duo, Tenacious D.

2004–2006
In 2004, Koechner landed his largest film role up to that point, as sports reporter Champ Kind in Anchorman: The Legend of Ron Burgundy. As part of the Anchorman ensemble, Koechner shared two MTV Movie Award nominations for Best On-Screen Team and Best Musical Performance. MTV's initial press release accidentally listed Fred Armisen instead of David Koechner, but eventually corrected the error on their website, crediting Koechner during the broadcast. Following this role, he landed small and supporting roles in such films such The 40-Year-Old Virgin, Talladega Nights, The Dukes of Hazzard and Snakes on a Plane. In 2006, he made his voice acting debut in Barnyard as "Dag". That same year, he had a supporting role as a gun lobbyist in the critically acclaimed satire, Thank You for Smoking. Thank You for Smoking was one of the best-reviewed films of Koechner's career, and he was included in Fox Searchlight's Oscar campaign, among the film's listings for Best Supporting Actor.

After co-starring in Anchorman and The 40-Year-Old Virgin, fellow Second City alum Steve Carell personally recommended Koechner for a recurring role on NBC's The Office, playing Todd Packer. Koechner's role is the American version of Chris Finch from the original. Packer is an obnoxious, alcoholic best friend of Carell's character. Koechner guest-starred, both in person and voice, on fifteen episodes of the series. His frequent work with actors Ferrell, Carell, Jack Black, and Ben Stiller have led some critics and journalists to point out his association with the media-dubbed "Frat Pack". David had a guest starring role as Uncle Earl in an episode on Hannah Montana.

2007–present
In 2007, Koechner was seen in his first leading role in The Comebacks (which opened on October 19), the first comedy to be released under Fox Searchlight's Fox Atomic division. He played a college football coach with the worst record in the history of the sport who vows to turn things around with his new team of ragtag recruits. He described this career opportunity as the "first lead for the right-hander." Veteran actor Carl Weathers played Koechner's rival coach. Though Koechner, who usually writes and improvises his material, had no involvement with the screenplay, he complimented director Tom Brady for taking "great care to make it as smart as he could", adding that it is a sports comedy rather than a spoof.

On January 17, 2007, Comedy Central premiered The Naked Trucker and T-Bones Show, a sketch comedy series starring Koechner (as T-Bones) and longtime performing partner Dave "Gruber" Allen (as The Naked Trucker). The duo performs their unique brand of off-color songs and introduces pre-taped skits. Many of Koechner's past co-stars made cameos, including Will Ferrell, Jack Black, Steve Carell, Andy Richter, Dax Shepard, and Paul Rudd. The pre-taped skits gave Koechner more screen time than Allen, often letting him showcase his comedic charisma alongside guest stars like Richter and Shepard. Comedy Central ordered eight episodes.

In the eight years Koechner & Allen have been playing these characters, there have been several attempts to bring the act to television, but they had trouble figuring how to translate it into a series. Koechner & Allen's first album, Naked Trucker and T-Bones Live at the Troubador, was released March 20, 2007. Koechner co-starred with Luke Wilson in the 2009 indie-comedy Tenure and was a lead in the 2012 horror film Piranha 3DD. Koechner returned as Champ Kind, in Anchorman 2: The Legend Continues (2013). 

Following the release of Live at the Troubador, Koechner revealed that a T-Bones film is in development with Will Ferrell and Adam McKay's Gary Sanchez Productions. Koechner wrote the script with veteran television writer/producer Norm Hiscock, who also wrote for The Naked Trucker and T-Bones Show, in addition to past work on Saturday Night Live, The Kids in the Hall, and King of the Hill. He made his first return guest appearance to Saturday Night Live on December 7, 2013, with his fellow Anchorman co-stars Will Ferrell, Steve Carell, and the episode's host, Paul Rudd. The Anchorman stars sang "Afternoon Delight" with the episode's musical guest One Direction during the opening monologue. Koechner and Ferrell also reprised their Bill Brasky sketch in the same episode.

In 2015, Koechner began co-starring as Commodore Bellacourt in the Comedy Central series Another Period. He also recurs as Bill Lewis on The Goldbergs.

In a contrast to his largely comedy-based acting career, Koechner starred in the 2016 drama Priceless, a film about human trafficking. He said of the role, "My wife and I have five kids – three of them are daughters. So, just to imagine the horror of any young lady having to go through this. This film is based on true events. It's happening right now. It's happening in Chicago. It's happening here in Los Angeles. It's happening globally. So, to be a participant in a film like this – to bring awareness to such a horror – makes me happy."

Personal life
Koechner lives in Los Angeles and is separated from his wife Leigh. They have five children. Koechner has the names of his wife and children tattooed on his right upper-arm. In 2020, Koechner filed for divorce.

Koechner performs regularly in Los Angeles comedy clubs such as Flappers Comedy Club, Improv Olympic, West Theater (in the show Beer Shark Mice), and Largo, the nightclub where the Naked Trucker Show plays regularly. Koechner supported the 2004 US presidential campaign of Senator John Kerry, performing at a June 6, 2004, Hollywood fundraiser for the senator, where The Naked Trucker & T-Bones opened up for Tenacious D.

On December 31, 2021, Koechner was arrested on New Year's Eve for a suspected DUI and hit and run in Simi Valley, California. A court date was set for March 30 in Ventura, California. On March 31, he was charged with a DUI and hit and run and may face up to six months in jail for each misdemeanor charge, probation, and required to take an alcohol education course.

On June 4, 2022, Koechner was arrested for DUI in Ohio, his second DUI arrest in under six months.

Filmography

Film

Television

Music videos

References

External links

 
 
 Interview with Koechner & partner Dave 'Gruber' Allen on public radio program The Sound of Young America

1962 births
American male comedians
American comedy musicians
American male film actors
American people of English descent
American people of German descent
American people of Irish descent
American stand-up comedians
American male television actors
American television writers
American male television writers
American male voice actors
American male writers
Living people
Male actors from Missouri
People from Moniteau County, Missouri
University of Missouri alumni
20th-century American comedians
21st-century American comedians
20th-century American male actors
21st-century American male actors
American sketch comedians
American male screenwriters
Comedians from Missouri
Benedictine College alumni
Screenwriters from Missouri
Frat Pack